Becherov is a municipality (village) in Slovakia in the Bardejov Districtin the Prešov Region near the border with Poland.

It had 284 inhabitants in 2006 (274 according to the 2001 census, out of which 133 Ruthenians, 82 Slovaks and 45 Ukrainians). It covers an area of 1909 ha.

The village features:
 the Greek Catholic church of Virgin Mary built in 1847
 an Orthodox church with features of Old Russian Baroque
 the Natural Nature Reserve Becherovská tisina – Becherov yew forest (declared in 1954, area 24.13 ha, features: rare fauna and flora, a sulphatic water spring
 World War I memorial and cemetery built in 1933 which was projected by Dušan Jurkovič
 World War II memorial
 a border crossing point to Poland (opened in 1994)
 an annual folklore festival called  Bonfire meeting

See also
 List of municipalities and towns in Slovakia

References

Genealogical resources
The records for genealogical research are available at the state archive "Statny Archiv in Presov, Slovakia"

 Roman Catholic church records (births/marriages/deaths): 1695–1895 (parish B)
 Greek Catholic church records (births/marriages/deaths): 1841–1898 (parish A)

External links
 
Surnames of living people in Becherov

Villages and municipalities in Bardejov District
Šariš